Alexis Iván Alvariño (born 1 February 2001) is an Argentine footballer who plays as a defender and midfielder for Guarani on loan from Boca Juniors.

Career

Boca Juniors

Guarani (loan)
On 3 August 2022 Alvariño moved to Brazilian club Guarani on a one-year loan until 30 June 2023.

Career statistics

Club

References

2001 births
Living people
Footballers from Buenos Aires
Argentine footballers
Association football midfielders
Argentine Primera División players
Campeonato Brasileiro Série B players
Boca Juniors footballers
People from La Matanza Partido
Expatriate footballers in Brazil
Argentine expatriate sportspeople in Brazil